Đăk Tô is a rural district of Kon Tum province in Central Highlands region of Vietnam.

As of 2018, the district had a population of 38,642. The district covers an area of 509.24 km². The district capital lies at Đăk Tô.

Geography
Located just north of the Vietnamese town of Tân Cảnh (nicknamed "Tin Can" by American GIs), Đăk Tô is populated by a Montagnard tribal people known as the Degar. Đăk Tô is in a lush region of forest-covered mountains and deep valleys, with many streams.

History
During the Vietnam War, Đăk Tô was viewed as a strategic area because of its proximity to a major branch of the Ho Chi Minh trail, which Hanoi maintained through the neighboring country of Laos. It was the site of the Battle of Đăk Tô.

Industry
It is part of the Kon Tum province industrial area.

References

Districts of Kon Tum province